Sally Carr (born 28 March 1945) is a Scottish singer, best known as the lead singer of the 1970s pop group Middle of the Road.

Personal life
Sarah Cecilia Carr was born on 28 March 1945. She has four brothers. Her father was a miner. Her mother, Cecilia, was bedridden. When Carr was a child, the family used to sing around a piano; Carr never had any professional vocal training. Carr still performs at oldies concerts as of 2010.

In 1978, Carr married journalist Chick Young and had a son, Keith, in 1980. They separated in 1984, but did not divorce, and remained friends. On 18 January 2001, Keith was killed in a motorbike accident.

Music
Carr's first group was The Southerners. In 1971, the group Middle of the Road was formed, and Carr had success with songs such as "Soley Soley" and "Chirpy Chirpy Cheep Cheep". Following the death of her mother Cecilia, Carr found it difficult to sing the lines "Where's your Mama gone?" and "Woke up this morning and my Mama was gone" from that song.

References

1945 births
Living people
Place of birth missing (living people)
20th-century Scottish women singers